The Europe/Africa Zone was one of three zones of regional competition in the 2001 Fed Cup.

Group I
Venue: Murcia, Spain (outdoor clay)
Date: 24–28 April

The seventeen teams were divided into four pools, three of which had four and one of which had five teams. The top team of each pool played off in a randomly drawn tie to determine which two nations progress to the World Group Play-offs. The four nations coming last in the pools were relegated to Group II for 2001.

Pools

Play-offs

  and  advanced to 2001 World Group Play-offs.

Group II
Venue: Belek, Antalya, Turkey (outdoor clay) 
Date: 14–17 May

The eighteen teams were divided into two pools of five and two pools of four. The top teams from each pool advanced to Group I for 2002.

Pools

See also
Fed Cup structure

References

 Fed Cup Profile, Netherlands
 Fed Cup Profile, Yugoslavia
 Fed Cup Profile, Poland
 Fed Cup Profile, Slovenia
 Fed Cup Profile, Ukraine
 Fed Cup Profile, Estonia
 Fed Cup Profile, Sweden
 Fed Cup Profile, Belarus
 Fed Cup Profile, Romania
 Fed Cup Profile, Israel
 Fed Cup Profile, Greece
 Fed Cup Profile, Luxembourg
 Fed Cup Profile, Bulgaria
 Fed Cup Profile, Georgia
 Fed Cup Profile, Latvia
 Fed Cup Profile, Ireland
 Fed Cup Profile, Portugal
 Fed Cup Profile, Tunisia
 Fed Cup Profile, Finland
 Fed Cup Profile, Algeria
 Fed Cup Profile, Bosnia and Herzegovina
 Fed Cup Profile, Egypt
 Fed Cup Profile, Armenia
 Fed Cup Profile, Lesotho
 Fed Cup Profile, Turkey
 Fed Cup Profile, Lithuania
 Fed Cup Profile, Botswana

External links
 Fed Cup website

 
Europe Africa
Sport in Murcia
Tennis tournaments in Spain
Sport in Antalya
21st century in Antalya
Tennis tournaments in Turkey
Fed